Danehill is a village in East Sussex, England.

Governance
Danehill is part of the electoral ward called Danehill/Fletching/Nutley. The population of this ward taken at the 2011 Census was 5,346.

Religious sites
There are two Anglican churches in the parish: one at Danehill (dedicated to All Saints) and the other at Chelwood Gate.

Education
There are two schools in the area: the state-run Danehill Church of England primary school and the independent Cumnor House prep school.

Culture and community
The public houses are Coach and Horses (Danehill) and the Red Lion at Chelwood Gate. Musician Maurice Gibb lived in the village for some time.

The Ashdown Weekend is a village event, begun in 1973 and serving to make money for different organisations in the village.

The actor Peter Butterworth, best known for appearing in the Carry On films, and his wife, the comedian Janet Brown, are buried in Danehill churchyard.

History

The first written evidence of the village comes from 1265 and the first permanent houses from 1400. By 1660 the Red Round Inn became a stopping point for travellers between London and Lewes. After travellers continued to use Danehill's roads, the village decided to improve the roads which led to wealthy families moving into the area, such as John Baker Holroyd who moved into Sheffield Park in 1769 and was later to become the First Lord Sheffield.

Governance

The lowest tier of government for Danehill is the Parish Council. The council has nine seats, for which eleven candidates stood in May 2007 with an elector turnout of 39.92%. A November 2007 single seat by-election was uncontested.

Wealden District Council is the next tier of government, for which Danehill is part of the Danehill/Fletching/Nutley ward. The ward returns two councillors. The ward was uncontested in the May 2007 election and two Conservative councillors were returned.

Danehill is represented at the East Sussex County Council as part of the Buxted Maresfield Ward. The May 2005 election returned the Conservative Councillor Anthony Reid.

The parliamentary constituency for Danehill is Wealden.

Prior to Brexit in 2020, the village was part of the South East England constituency in the European Parliament.

Notable people

Peter Butterworth, Carry On Films actor - buried here
Maurice Gibb - lived here for several years
Robert Cecil, 1st Viscount Cecil of Chelwood, diplomat who won the Nobel Peace Prize in 1937 - buried here 
Janet Brown - buried alongside her husband, Peter Butterworth

References 

 
Villages in East Sussex
Civil parishes in East Sussex
Wealden District